Elias Abraham Bowie Jr. (May 10, 1910 – January 26, 2005) was an American professional stock car racing driver. He is credited as being the first African-American to start a top-level NASCAR race, doing so in 1955 at Bay Meadows Racetrack.

Racing career
Bowie made his lone NASCAR Grand National Series start on July 31, 1955. Driving a Cadillac at Bay Meadows Racetrack, a mile-long dirt track, Bowie completed 172 of 252 laps and finished 28th of 34 cars. He was noted for having the largest pit crew of all the drivers in the race.

Personal life
Although sometimes denoted as 1909 or 1914, Bowie was born in 1910 in San Antonio, Texas, to a laundress and a hotel porter. He was a transportation entrepreneur in the San Francisco Bay, California area.

Motorsports career results

NASCAR 
(key) (Bold – Pole position awarded by qualifying time. Italics – Pole position earned by points standings or practice time. * – Most laps led.)

Strictly Stock/Grand National Series

References

External links
 

1910 births
2005 deaths
African-American racing drivers
Sportspeople from San Antonio
NASCAR drivers
Racing drivers from San Antonio
Racing drivers from Texas
Racing drivers from California
20th-century African-American sportspeople
21st-century African-American people